

Safavid governors of Kerman (1502–1736)

Sources 
 

 
Iran-related lists
Lists of office-holders in Iran